"Be, and it is" is a phrase that occurs several times in the Quran, referring to creation by Allah. In Arabic the imperative verb be (kun) is spelled with the letters kāf and nūn.
Kun fa-yakūnu has its reference in the Quran cited as a symbol or sign of God's supreme creative power. The verse is from the Quranic Surah of Ya-Sin. In context, the words kun fa-yakūnu appear in the 36th Chapter, verse number 82:

Verse numbers
 2:117– He is the One Who has originated the heavens and the earth, and when He wills to (originate) a thing, He only says to it: 'Be', and it becomes.
 3:47– Maryam (Mary) submitted: 'O my Lord, how shall I have a son when no man has ever touched me?' He said: 'Just as Allah creates what He pleases.' When He decides (to do) some work, He just gives it the command 'Be', and it becomes.
 3:59– Surely, the example of ‘Isa (Jesus) in the sight of Allah is the same as that of Adam whom He formed from clay, then said (to him): 'Be'. And he became.
 6:73– And He is the One (Allah) Who has created the heavens and the earth (in accordance with His decreed celestial order based) on truth. And the Day when He will say: 'Be', then that (Day of Judgment) will come into being. His Word is the truth. And His will be the sovereignty on the Day when the Trumpet will be blown (by Israfil). He (is the One Who) has the knowledge of the unseen and the seen, and He is All-Wise, All-Aware.
 16:40– Our command for a thing is but only this much that when We intend (to bring) it (into existence), We say to it: 'Be', and it becomes.
 19:35– It is not Allah's Glory that He should take (to Himself anyone as) a son. Holy and Glorified is He (above this)! When He decrees any matter, He only says to it: 'Be', and it becomes.
 36:82– All it takes, when He wills something ˹to be˺, is simply to say to it: “Be!” And it is!
 40:68– He is the One Who gives life and causes death. Then when He decides upon a thing, He says to it only: 'Be', so it becomes.

In popular culture
The soundtrack  of Indian Hindi film Rockstar (2011) has a qawwali ghazal by the title "Kun Faya Kun", composed by A. R. Rahman and picturised at the mausoleum of 13th-century Sufi saint, Nizamuddin Auliya in Delhi.

See also
 I Am that I Am
 Soham (Sanskrit)

References

Quranic words and phrases
Quotations
Arabic words and phrases